Daniel Gardner (born 6 March 1996) is a British professional racing cyclist. He rode in the men's team time trial at the 2015 UCI Road World Championships.

References

External links

1996 births
Living people
British male cyclists
Place of birth missing (living people)
People from Haywards Heath